Megan Jones may refer to:
 Megan Jones (politician), Iowa politician
 Megan Jones (equestrian), Australian equestrian and Olympic medalist
 Megan Jones (rugby union), English rugby player